Warszkowo-Kolonia  is a settlement in the administrative district of Gmina Sławno, within Sławno County, West Pomeranian Voivodeship, in north-western Poland.

For the history of the region, see History of Pomerania.

References

Warszkowo-Kolonia